SC Bietigheim-Bissingen, also known as the Bietigheim Steelers, is a professional ice hockey team based in Bietigheim-Bissingen, Germany. They currently play in DEL2, the second highest-level league in Germany.

History
The club was created as SC Bietigheim-Bissingen-Kornwestheim e.V. in 1988. In 1991, they were renamed SC Bietigheim-Bissingen. In 2000, the club was promoted to the 2nd Bundesliga. They played the next 20 seasons in Germany's second-tiered ice hockey league, the DEL2, before they were promoted to the Deutsche Eishockey Liga for the 2021–22 season.

The Steelers enjoyed a two-year tenure in the top flight DEL before finishing last in the 2022–23 season which sealed relegation to return to the DEL2 for the 2023–24 season on 1 March 2023.

Honours & Achievements
DEB-Pokal champion: 2012, 2013
2nd Bundesliga champion: 2009, 2013, 2021
2. Liga Süd champion: 1997

Season by season records

Players

Current roster 
Updated 15 February, 2023.

Coaching history

Richard Piasecki, 1989–1990
Danilo Valenti, 1990–1991
Richard Piasecki, 1991–1992
Jan Mancar, 1992–1993
Petteri Lehmussaari, 1993–1995
Wolfgang Rosenberg, 1995–1996
Petteri Lehmussaari, 1996–1997
Doug Kacharvich, 1997–1998
Tom Pokel, 1998–2001
Gary Prior, 2001–2002
Daniel Naud, 2002–2004
Uli Liebsch, 2004–2006
Michael Komma, 2006–2007
Christian Brittig, 2007–2010
Danny Held, 2010–2011
Kevin Gaudet, 2011–2018
Daniel Naud, 2018–2022
Pekka Kangasalusta, 2022–Present

References

External links

 
SC Bietigheim-Bissingen on Eurohockey
SC Bietigheim-Bissingen on HockeyDB

Ice hockey teams in Germany
Ice hockey teams in Baden-Württemberg
Ice hockey clubs established in 1988
1988 establishments in West Germany
Deutsche Eishockey Liga teams